Myeongbong Station is a railway station on the Gyeongjeon Line in South Korea.

Railway stations in South Jeolla Province